Rudy Salas (born March 12, 1977) is an American politician who served in the California State Assembly from 2012-2022. He is a Democrat who formerly represented the 32nd Assembly district, which encompasses Kings County and parts of northwestern Kern County. Prior to being elected to the Assembly in 2012, he served on the Bakersfield City Council.

Salas left his seat in the Assembly to run as the Democratic nominee for California's 22nd congressional district in 2022, narrowly losing to incumbent Republican David Valadao.

Elections

2012

When incumbent Assemblyman David Valadao announced that he would not run for reelection, instead seeking a congressional bid for the 21st district, the seat was left vacant. In the June 5 primary, Salas ran unopposed for the Democratic nomination and won the overall primary with 41.4% of the vote, or 13,053 votes, ahead of the three Republican candidates. He faced off against the primary runner-up, Republican former Delano Mayor Pedro Rios, in the November 6 general election. Salas came in first by a smaller margin than before, with 38,759 total votes (52.9%) to Rios's 34,476 (47.1%). He was sworn in on December 3, 2012.

2014

Salas ran for re-election in November 2014, again against former Delano Mayor Pedro Rios, who defeated Delano Union School Board trustee Romeo Agbalog in the June 2014 Republican primary election.

He was described as a moderate Democrat, colloquially referred to as a "Valleycrat" by some.

Salas won the rematch in the November 4 general election with 54.8% to Rios's 45.2%.

2016

Salas ran for a third term in 2016. He faced minimal opposition in the primary, with Republican Manuel Ramirez running a write-in campaign that garnered 1% of the primary vote. In the general election, Salas won his largest victory yet with 65% to Ramirez's 35%.

2018

Salas ran for a fourth consecutive term in 2018. He was challenged by Republican Hanford City Councilman Justin Mendes, a staffer for Congressman David Valadao (whom Salas succeeded in the Assembly in 2012).

2020

Salas ran for reelection and faced Republican Todd Cotta, a Hanford gun store owner in the primary.

2022

Salas left his seat in the state assembly to run for Congress, he was defeated by incumbent Republican, David Valadao in a close race.

2024

Salas announced he would run again for congress in 2024.

Electoral history

California's 32nd State Assembly district, 2012 (Primary):

 Rudy Salas – 13,053 (41.4%)
 Pedro A. Rios – 7,550 (23.9%)
 Jon McQuiston – 6,530 (20.7%)
 David Thomas – 4,420 (14.0%)

California's 32nd State Assembly district, 2012:

 Rudy Salas – 38,759 (52.9%)
 Pedro A. Rios – 34,476 (47.1%)

California's 32nd State Assembly district, 2014 (Primary):

 Rudy Salas (incumbent) – 11,577 (43.9%)
 Pedro A. Rios – 9,183 (34.8%)
 Romeo Agbalog – 5,628 (21.3%)

California's 32nd State Assembly district, 2014:

 Rudy Salas (incumbent) – 26,721 (54.8%)
 Pedro A. Rios – 22,031 (45.2%)

California's 32nd State Assembly district, 2016 (Primary):

 Rudy Salas (incumbent) – 30,806 (98.9%)
 Manuel Ramirez (write-in) – 334 (1.1%)California's 32nd State Assembly district, 2016: Rudy Salas (incumbent) – 53,056 (65.1%)
 Manuel Ramirez – 28,502 (34.9%)

California's 32nd State Assembly district, 2018:

Rudy Salas (incumbent) – 26,646 (67.96%)
 Justin Mendez – 12,562 (32.04%)

California's 32nd State Assembly district, 2020:

 Rudy Salas*, DEM 63,450 60.0% 
 Todd Cotta, REP 42,328 40.0%

References

External links 

 Rudy Salas for Congress campaign website
 Assemblymember Rudy Salas official legislative website

1977 births
21st-century American politicians
California city council members
Candidates in the 2022 United States House of Representatives elections
Hispanic and Latino American state legislators in California
Living people
Democratic Party members of the California State Assembly
Politicians from Bakersfield, California
University of California, Los Angeles alumni